Harz is a large mountain range in Germany. Harz may refer also refer to:

People
Harz (surname)

Places
Harz (district), district in Saxony-Anhalt
Harz (Landkreis Goslar), unincorporated area in Goslar district, Lower Saxony
Harz (Landkreis Göttingen), unincorporated area in Göttingen district, Lower Saxony